is a Japanese hypersonic glide vehicle being intended to be used as a hypersonic weapon in defending of remote islands.

Design and capabilities 
The HVGP is designed as a standoff missile capable of attacking enemy forces invading remote islands in Japan from outside the enemy weapon engagement zone. The development of the HVGP is based on an incremental approach, with Block 1 being developed as an early version based on existing technology, followed by the development of a performance-enhancing Block 2. Both of them are designed for launch using a solid-propellant rocket booster, with the projectile separating from it at a high altitude and then gliding at hypersonic speeds until impact. In Block 2, glide performance will be further improved by introducing waverider technology.

Projectile guidance would be primarily provided by satellite navigation, with inertial navigation system as a backup. Radio-frequency imaging and infrared homing would also be used for guidance when engaging moving targets. Special armour-piercing ammunitions, capable of penetrating the deck of aircraft carriers, are used to attack ships, and high-density explosively formed projectiles (EFPs), capable of area suppression, are used to attack ground targets.

Deployment 
The plan is to complete the development of Block 1 by FY2025 and begin deployment in FY2026, and to begin deployment of Block 2 in the 2030s, deploying two battalions in the Japan Ground Self-Defense Force. These batteries are being considered for deployment in Hokkaido and Kyushu.

The development of a submarine-launched version is under consideration, reportedly.

References

Bibliography 
 
 
 
 

Guided missiles of Japan